This was the first edition of the tournament.

Aleksandra Krunić and Nina Stojanović won the title, defeating Greet Minnen and Alison Van Uytvanck in the final, 6–0, 6–2.

Seeds

Draw

Draw

References

External Links
Main Draw

2021 WTA Tour
2021 Serbia Open – Women's Doubles